Shallon Jade Olsen (born 10 July 2000) is a Canadian artistic gymnast. She is the 2018 World silver medalist and 2018 Commonwealth Games champion on vault. She is also the 2018 Commonwealth Games floor exercise bronze medalist and the 2019 Pan American Games vault bronze medalist. She was a member of the Canadian team that won the gold medal at the 2018 Commonwealth Games and the silver medal at the 2019 Pan American Games. She is also the 2016 Pacific Rim vault champion, team silver medalist, and floor exercise bronze medalist. She represented Canada at the 2016 Olympics where she was the youngest member of the Canadian Olympic team and at the 2020 Olympic Games. Additionally, she currently competes for the University of Alabama gymnastics team, and she helped the Crimson Tide win the 2021 SEC Championships.

Early life
Shallon Olsen was born on 10 July 2000 in Vancouver to parents Tony Olsen and Jayne Chow-Olsen, and she has an older brother named Chas. She began gymnastics when she was three years old. She attended Centennial Secondary in Coquitlam, British Columbia outside of her hometown of Surrey to remain close to her six-day a week training at Omega Gymnastics.

Novice career
Olsen made her elite debut at 2009 Elite Canada where she placed fifth in the all-around in the novice division. She won the bronze medal on the floor exercise behind Maegan Chant and Jordyn Pedersen. In 2010, she won the gold medal in the all-around at Elite Canada and the silver medal at the Novice Canadian Championships.

At the 2011 Canada Winter Games in Halifax, Nova Scotia, Olsen won the silver medal with the British Columbia team. Individually, she won the bronze medal on the balance beam and the gold medal on the floor exercise. She won the gold medal in the all-around and on the vault and the silver medals on the uneven bars, balance beam, and floor exercise at the 2011 Novice Canadian Championships.

Junior career

2012
Olsen moved up to the junior level in 2012 and won the gold medal in the all-around at Elite Canada. In the event finals, she won the gold medals on the vault and on the floor exercise and tied for the silver medal on the uneven bars and placed eighth on the balance beam. She also won the all-around gold medal at the Canadian Gymnastics Championship in Regina, Saskatchewan. She made her international debut at the Élite Gym Massilia in November, winning gold with her team and silver in the all-around behind compatriot Rose-Kaying Woo.

2013
Olsen began her 2013 season by defending her Elite Canada all-around title. Additionally, she won the gold medal on the vault and the silver medal on the floor exercise, and she finished sixth on the uneven bars and fourth on the balance beam. She then competed at the International Gymnix, winning gold on vault and placing tenth in the all-around. In May, she competed at the Canadian Championships, winning gold in the all-around, vault, and floor exercise, and placing fourth on bars and fifth on beam. In November, she competed again at the Élite Gym Massilia placing fifth with the Canadian team, thirteenth in the all-around, and fourth on vault. Olsen was awarded the Kate Richardson Outstanding Female Athlete of the Year by Gymnastics British Columbia.

2014
In February, Olsen began her season at Elite Canada, winning gold on vault and floor and silver in the all-around, uneven bars, and balance beam. One month later at the International Gymnix, she won gold on vault, silver with her team and on floor, bronze in the all-around, and placed seventh on balance beam. She then traveled to Aracaju, Brazil for the Junior Pan American Championships and won team gold alongside teammates Rose-Kaying Woo, Megan Roberts, and Sydney Townsend. In the event finals, Olsen won the silver medal on the vault behind Brazil's Rebeca Andrade and placed forth on the floor exercise. Then at the Pacific Championships in Richmond, she helped team Canada win the silver medal behind the United States. Individually, Olsen finished seventh in the all-around and sixth on uneven bars, and she won the bronze medal on vault and the silver medal on floor exercise. In May, Olsen competed at the Canadian National Championships, winning vault gold, all-around, uneven bars, and balance beam silver, and floor exercise bronze. Then in November, she competed at the Elite Gym Massilia and won silver on vault and placed fifth with her team and eleventh in the all-around.

2015
Olsen competed in the senior division of the Elite Canada in late January, winning vault gold, floor exercise bronze, and placing sixth in the all-around and eighth on beam. Then at the Canada Games, she helped the British Columbia team win the bronze medal. Individually, Olsen won the silver medal in the all-around behind Rose-Kaying Woo and on vault and floor exercise behind Megan Roberts. She also won the bronze on the uneven bars and placed fourth on the balance beam. In March, she competed at the International Gymnix, winning team and vault gold and placing eighth in the all-around. Then at the City of Jesolo Trophy, she won team and vault silver and placed tenth in the all-around. Her final competition of the season was the Canadian Championships where she placed sixth in the all-around in the senior division.

Senior career

2016
Olsen made her senior debut at Elite Canada in February. She placed fourteenth in the all-around and won the title on vault. She went on to compete at the WOGA Classic in Frisco, Texas, winning vault and floor exercise gold and all-around silver behind Japan's Nagi Kajita. Then in March, she competed at the International Gymnix, winning gold on vault and bronze on floor, and placing fourth with her team and twelfth in the all-around. In April, she competed at the Pacific Rim Championships in Everett, Washington winning vault gold, team silver, floor exercise bronze, and placing fourth in the all-around and seventh on the balance beam. She then competed at the Canadian Championships, winning vault gold, floor exercise silver, and placing fourth in the all-around, ninth on uneven bars, and eleventh on the balance beam. Then at the Canadian Olympic Trials, she won the bronze medal in the all-around.

Olsen was named to the Canadian Olympic team in late June alongside Ellie Black, Isabela Onyshko, Brittany Rogers, and Rose-Kaying Woo. She was the youngest athlete on Team Canada. During the qualification round, Canada finished ninth and missed qualifying for the team final by less than 0.200, but Olsen qualified for the vault final in sixth place. She finished eighth in the final after touching her knee to the mat on the Amanar vault.

2017
In February, Olsen competed at Elite Canada, winning gold on vault and placing fifth on the uneven bars and sixth in the all-around. Based on her showing at Elite Canada, she was selected to compete at both the International Gymnix and the City of Jesolo Trophy, winning vault at both competitions and winning silver in the all-around and bronze on floor at the International Gymnix. Later that year at the Canadian Championships, she won her seventh consecutive national vault title and was named to Canada's World Championship team along with Olympic teammates Ellie Black and Isabela Onyshko and first-year senior Brooklyn Moors. Prior to the World Championships, she competed at the Varna World Cup, winning silver on both the vault and floor exercise behind Brazilians Rebeca Andrade and Thais Fidelis, respectively. After winning the two silver medals, she stated, "I feel very happy with the results and it makes me feel very confident heading into worlds and future competitions." At the World Championships in Montreal, she competed on the vault and floor exercise, qualifying in fourth place into the vault final and competing a clean routine on the floor exercise to score a 13.133, but she did not qualify for that final. In the vault final, she overrotated and crashed her Amanar, finishing seventh. Afterward, she revealed that she had committed to the University of Alabama’s gymnastics team, and would begin competing for them in the 2018-2019 school year.

2018
Olsen began her 2018 season at Elite Canada, winning the gold medal on the vault and the silver on the floor exercise behind Brooklyn Moors. She was selected to compete at the International Gymnix, where she again won gold on vault. She also placed fifth in the all-around, ninth on the balance beam, and fourth on the floor exercise. She was selected to the Canadian team for the 2018 Commonwealth Games held in Gold Coast, Australia alongside Ellie Black, Jade Chrobok, Isabela Onyshko, and Brittany Rogers. Olsen helped the Canadian team win the gold medal, and she qualified first into the vault final and third into the floor final. In the vault final, she scored a 14.800 for her first vault and a 14.366 for her second, winning the gold medal with a 14.566 average. Then in the floor exercise final she scored a 13.266 and won the bronze medal behind Alexandra Eade and Latalia Bevan. At the Canadian Championships, she won the gold medals on the vault and the floor exercise.

Olsen was named to Canada's World Championships team alongside Ellie Black, Sophie Marois, Brooklyn Moors, and Ana Padurariu. The team placed fourth in the team final, Canada's highest finish ever at the World Artistic Gymnastics Championships. In the vault final, Olsen won the silver medal behind Simone Biles. This was the third medal won by a Canadian woman at the World Championships and the first one on vault. After winning the silver medal, Olsen said, "This is absolutely insane, I did not think I was going to come second behind Simone Biles, because she's literally amazing. I'm just really happy and ecstatic right now."

2019
In May, Olsen competed at the Canadian National Championships, winning gold on vault and placing fifth and fourth and beam and floor respectively. In June, she was named to the team to compete at the 2019 Pan American Games alongside Ellie Black, Ana Padurariu (later replaced by Isabela Onyshko), Brooklyn Moors, and Victoria-Kayen Woo. The team won the silver medal behind the United States. During the vault final Olsen upgraded her López to a Cheng and was able to win the bronze behind Black and Yesenia Ferrera of Cuba. She was named to the team to compete at the World Championships in Stuttgart, Germany alongside Ana Padurariu, Ellie Black, Brooklyn Moors, and Victoria-Kayen Woo. During qualifications, Olsen helped Canada place fifth, thereby qualifying Canada a team for the 2020 Olympic Games. The team went on to place seventh in the team final. Then in the vault final, she finished in fourth place behind Americans Simone Biles and Jade Carey and Ellie Downie of Great Britain.

2020–2021
Olsen only competed once during the 2020 elite season- at Elite Canada on the vault and the uneven bars, finishing first and eighth respectively. She returned to elite competition at the 2021 First Canadian Technical Trial, a virtual competition for Olympic team selection, and placed fourth in the all-around. At the Second Trial, she competed only on the vault and won the gold medal. At the Canadian Championships, she placed eleventh in the all-around but won gold on the vault.  On June 17, Olsen was officially named to Canada's 2020 Olympic team alongside Ellie Black, Brooklyn Moors, and Ava Stewart. During the qualification round, the Canadian team placed tenth, missing the team final, but Olsen qualified for the vault final in sixth place. In the vault final, she finished seventh with an average score of 14.550.

2022
In July Olsen competed at the Pan American Championships alongside Denelle Pedrick, Ava Stewart, Sydney Turner, and Rose-Kaying Woo.  They finished third as a team and individually Olsen placed fifth on vault.  In late October Olsen was set to compete at the World Championships in Liverpool alongside Ellie Black, Emma Spence, Pedrick, Turner, and Laurie Denommée; however the sudden death of her mother left her unable to compete.  Although Olsen was not physically in Liverpool, she was still officially part of the Canadian delegation as the alternate.  During the team final the Canadian team won a historic bronze medal, their first team medal at the World Championships.  As the alternate Olsen was also awarded the team medal.

NCAA career 
Olsen joined the Alabama Crimson Tide women's gymnastics team in the fall of 2018. She made her NCAA gymnastics debut at Alabama on January 5, 2019, winning the vault title in a quad meet against Southeast Missouri, Temple and Northern Illinois. At the Southeastern Conference Championships, Olsen helped Alabama finish third behind LSU and Florida. She also received All-SEC and SEC Freshman honors for her performance on the balance beam where she received a 9.925. At regionals she contributed to Alabama’s third-place finish behind Michigan and UCLA, just missing a spot at nationals for the first time since 1982. She was named Alabama Gymnastics Rookie of the Year at the conclusion of the 2019 season. During the 2020 season, Olsen competed at every meet before the season was cut short due to the COVID-19 pandemic in the United States. At the 2021 SEC Championships, Olsen helped Alabama win the team title, the school's first SEC title since 2015. Olsen was named to the SEC Academic Honor Roll and as a Scholastic All-American in 2019, 2020, and 2021.

Personal life 
Olsen studies communications at the University of Alabama. Her hobbies include reading, completing word searches, baking, biking, and going to the movies.

Competitive history

References

External links 
 

2000 births
Living people
Canadian female artistic gymnasts
Sportspeople from Vancouver
Gymnasts at the 2016 Summer Olympics
Olympic gymnasts of Canada
Gymnasts at the 2018 Commonwealth Games
Gymnasts at the 2019 Pan American Games
Commonwealth Games medallists in gymnastics
Commonwealth Games gold medallists for Canada
Commonwealth Games bronze medallists for Canada
Medalists at the World Artistic Gymnastics Championships
Pan American Games medalists in gymnastics
Pan American Games silver medalists for Canada
Alabama Crimson Tide women's gymnasts
Medalists at the 2019 Pan American Games
Gymnasts at the 2020 Summer Olympics
21st-century Canadian women
Medallists at the 2018 Commonwealth Games